HCBC may refer to:

Hatfield College Boat Club, a rowing club at the University of Durham, England
Hertford College Boat Club, a rowing club at the University of Oxford, England
Homerton College Boat Club, a rowing club at the University of Cambridge, England